Samuel Fleming (29 September 1891 – 15 August 1951) was a Scottish footballer who played as an inside right, primarily for Hibernian where he played regularly six seasons from 1911 and 1917; he took part in the 1914 Scottish Cup Final which Hibs lost to Celtic after a replay.

After a year of being registered with Hibernian but without playing for them (the absence possibly relating to World War I commitments) he signed St Mirren, but only stayed there for a matter of weeks, making one Scottish Football League appearance before moving on to Clyde. He remained at Shawfield for four years and was part of a team defeated in a final by Celtic for a second time, this time in the Glasgow Cup of 1920. Fleming signed for Albion Rovers in 1922, and after seemingly having retired two years later, he made another single appearance for a Renfrewshire-based club, this time third-tier Johnstone, in 1926.

References

1891 births
1951 deaths
Footballers from Glasgow
Scottish footballers
Scottish Football League players
Hibernian F.C. players
Vale of Clyde F.C. players
Scottish Junior Football Association players
Clyde F.C. players
St Mirren F.C. players
Albion Rovers F.C. players
Johnstone F.C. players
Association football inside forwards